Guillaume de Harsigny (1300 – 10 July 1393) was a French doctor and court physician to Charles V of France. 

When Harcigny was practicing medicine, he traveled across the Mediterranean - notably to Italy, Palestine, Syria, and Egypt. He learned new medical techniques and compiled information in medical manuscripts as he traveled.

He became most famous, however, for operating on the skull of King Charles VI of France during the Hundred Years’ War.
One of the most notable physicians of his day, at age 92, Harsigny played a crucial role in the recovery of Charles VI of France from a coma brought about by a fit of insanity.  

In 1393, Harcigny died in his home in Laon, France. Following his death in 1393, Harsigny was buried in a tomb which featured one of the earliest examples of medieval cadaver tomb (transi tomb) sculpture.

Just before he died, Harcigny commissioned his transi tomb to be created to mirror what his corpse looked like at the time of his death. The sculpture is currently displayed at the Musée de Laon.

Notes

References

Bibliography

Glain, Stephen. (2005).  Mullahs, Merchants, and Militants: The Economic Collapse of the Arab World. St. Martin's Griffin. 
 Tuchman, Barbara. (1978).  A Distant Mirror: The Calamitous 14th Century. New York: Ballantine. 

14th-century French physicians
1300 births
1393 deaths